The economy of Japan is a highly developed social market economy, often referred to as an East Asian model. It is the third-largest in the world by nominal GDP and the fourth-largest by purchasing power parity (PPP). It is the world's second-largest developed economy. Japan is a member of both the G7 and G20. According to the World Bank, the country's per capita GDP (PPP) was at $49,000 (2022). Due to a volatile currency exchange rate, Japan's GDP as measured in dollars fluctuates sharply. Accounting for these fluctuations through the use of the Atlas method, Japan is estimated to have a GDP per capita around $39,048. The Japanese economy is forecast by the Quarterly Tankan survey of business sentiment conducted by the Bank of Japan. The Nikkei 225 presents the monthly report of top blue chip equities on the Japan Exchange Group, which is the world's fifth-largest stock exchange by market capitalisation. In 2018, Japan was the world's fourth-largest importer and the fourth-largest exporter. It has the world's second-largest foreign-exchange reserves, worth $1.4 trillion. It ranks 5th on the Global Competitiveness Report. It ranks first in the world in the Economic Complexity Index. Japan is also the world's fourth-largest consumer market.

Japan is the world's second-largest automobile manufacturing country. It is often ranked among the world's most innovative countries, leading several measures of global patent filings. Facing increasing competition from China and South Korea, manufacturing in Japan currently focuses primarily on high-tech and precision goods, such as integrated circuits, hybrid vehicles, and robotics. Besides the Kantō region, the Kansai region is one of the leading industrial clusters and manufacturing centers for the Japanese economy. Japan is the world's largest creditor nation. Japan generally runs an annual trade surplus and has a considerable net international investment surplus. Japan has the third-largest financial assets in the world, valued at $12 trillion, or 8.6% of the global GDP total as of 2020. As of 2022, 47 of the Fortune Global 500 companies are based in Japan, down from 62 in 2013. The country is the third-largest in the world by total wealth.

Japan formerly had the second-largest assets and wealth, behind only the United States in both categories, until it was surpassed by China in both assets and wealth. Japan also had the world's second-largest economy by nominal GDP behind the United States. In 2010, it was surpassed by China.

Japan's asset price bubble collapse in 1991 led to a period of economic stagnation known as the "lost decade", sometimes extended to a "lost 20 years" or greater. From 1995 to 2007 GDP fell from $5.33 trillion to $5.04 trillion in nominal terms. From the early 2000s, the Bank of Japan set out to encourage economic growth through a novel policy of quantitative easing. Debt levels continued to rise in response to the national crises, such as the Great Recession in 2008, the Tōhoku earthquake and tsunami and Fukushima nuclear disaster in 2011, and with COVID-19 pandemic in 2020 and 2021. As of 2021, Japan has significantly higher levels of public debt than any other developed nation at approximately 260% of GDP. 45% of this debt is held by the Bank of Japan. The Japanese economy faces considerable challenges posed by an aging and declining population, which peaked at 128 million in 2010 and has fallen to 125.5 million as of 2022. Projections show the population will continue to fall, potentially to below 100  million by the middle of the 21st century.

Overview

In the three decades of economic development following 1960, rapid economic growth referred to as the Japanese post-war economic miracle occurred. By the guidance of Ministry of Economy, Trade and Industry, with average growth rates of 10% in the 1960s, 5% in the 1970s, and 4% in the 1980s, Japan was able to establish and maintain itself as the world's second-largest economy from 1978 until 2010, when it was surpassed by the People's Republic of China. By 1990, income per capita in Japan equaled or surpassed that in most countries in the West.

During the second half of the 1980s, rising stock and real estate prices created an economic bubble. The economic bubble came to an abrupt end as the Tokyo Stock Exchange crashed in 1990–92 and real estate prices peaked in 1991. Growth in Japan throughout the 1990s at 1.5% was slower than global growth, giving rise to the term Lost Decade. After another decade of low growth rate, the term became the Lost 20 Years. Nonetheless, GDP per capita growth from 2001 to 2010 has still managed to outpace Europe and the United States.
With this low growth rate, the national debt of Japan has expanded due to its considerable social welfare spending in an aging society with a shrinking tax-base. The scenario of "Abandoned homes" continues to spread from rural areas to urban areas in Japan.

A mountainous, volcanic island country, Japan has inadequate natural resources to support its growing economy and large population, and therefore exports goods in which it has a comparative advantage such as engineering-oriented, research and development-led industrial products in exchange for the import of raw materials and petroleum. Japan is among the top-three importers for agricultural products in the world next to the European Union and the United States in total volume for covering of its own domestic agricultural consumption. Tokyo Metropolitan Central Wholesale Market is the largest wholesale market for primary products in Japan, including the renowned Tsukiji fish market. Japanese whaling, ostensibly for research purposes, has been sued as illegal under international law.

Although many kinds of minerals were extracted throughout the country, most mineral resources had to be imported in the postwar era. Local deposits of metal-bearing ores were difficult to process because they were low grade. The nation's large and varied forest resources, which covered 70 percent of the country in the late 1980s, were not utilized extensively. Because of political decisions on local, prefectural, and national levels, Japan decided not to exploit its forest resources for economic gain. Domestic sources only supplied between 25 and 30 percent of the nation's timber needs. Agriculture and fishing were the best-developed resources, but only through years of painstaking investment and toil. The nation, therefore, built up the manufacturing and processing industries to convert raw materials imported from abroad. This strategy of economic development necessitated the establishment of a strong economic infrastructure to provide the needed energy, transportation, communications, and technological know-how.

Deposits of gold, magnesium, and silver meet current industrial demands, but Japan is dependent on foreign sources for many of the minerals essential to modern industry. Iron ore, copper, bauxite, and alumina must be imported, as well as many forest products.

Compared to other industrialized economies, Japan is characterized by its low levels of exports relative to the size of its GDP. From the period 1970-2018, Japan was either the least or second least export-dependent economy in the G7, and one of the least export-dependent economies in the world. It has also been one of the least trade-dependent economies in the 1970-2018 period.

Japan receives exceptionally low levels of foreign investment. Its inward FDI stock was by far the smallest in the G7 as of 2018, and less than those of much smaller economies such as Austria, Poland, and Sweden. Relative to GDP, its ratio of inward FDI stock is probably the lowest in the world.

Japan lags behind other developed countries in labor productivity. From 1970 to 2018 Japan has consistently had the lowest labor productivity in the G7. In 2020, Japan ranked 23rd in labor productivity among OECD nations. A particularity of the Japanese economy are very long-established businesses (shinise), of which some are over a thousand years old and enjoy great prestige. In contrast, startup culture is not as prominent in Japan as elsewhere. As of December 2021, Japan had just 6 i.e. less than 0.64% of world's total unicorn startups. One of the reasons for lagging behind in the startup scene has been the traditional cultural value systems, which conflict with the startup culture.

History

The economic history of Japan is one of the most studied. First was the foundation of Edo (in 1603) to whole inland economic developments, second was the Meiji Restoration (in 1868) to be the first non-European power, third was after the defeat of World War II (in 1945) when the island nation rose to become the world's second largest economy.

First contacts with Europe (16th century)

Japan was considered as a country rich in precious metals, mainly owing to Marco Polo's accounts of gilded temples and palaces, but also due to the relative abundance of surface ores characteristic of a massive huge volcanic country, before large-scale deep-mining became possible in Industrial times. Japan was to become a major exporter of silver, copper, and gold during the period until exports for those minerals were banned.

Renaissance Japan was also perceived as a sophisticated feudal society with a high culture and a strong pre-industrial technology. It was densely populated and urbanized. Prominent European observers of the time seemed to agree that the Japanese "excel not only all the other Oriental peoples, they surpass the Europeans as well" (Alessandro Valignano, 1584, "Historia del Principo y Progresso de la Compania de Jesus en las Indias Orientales).

Early European visitors were amazed by the quality of Japanese craftsmanship and metalsmithing. This stems from the fact that Japan itself is rather rich in natural resources found commonly in Europe, especially iron.

The cargo of the first Portuguese ships (usually about 4 smaller-sized ships every year) arriving in Japan almost entirely consisted of Chinese goods (silk, porcelain). The Japanese were very much looking forward to acquiring such goods, but had been prohibited from any contacts with the Emperor of China, as a punishment for Wakō pirate raids. The Portuguese (who were called Nanban, lit. Southern Barbarians) therefore found the opportunity to act as intermediaries in Asian trade.

Edo period (1603–1868)

The beginning of the Edo period coincides with the last decades of the Nanban trade period, during which intense interaction with European powers, on the economic and religious plane, took place. It is at the beginning of the Edo period that Japan built her first ocean-going Western-style warships, such as the San Juan Bautista, a 500-ton galleon-type ship that transported a Japanese embassy headed by Hasekura Tsunenaga to the Americas, which then continued to Europe. Also during that period, the bakufu commissioned around 350 Red Seal Ships, three-masted and armed trade ships, for intra-Asian commerce. Japanese adventurers, such as Yamada Nagamasa, were active throughout Asia.

In order to eradicate the influence of Christianization, Japan entered in a period of isolation called sakoku, during which its economy enjoyed stability and mild progress. But not long after, in the 1650s, the production of Japanese export porcelain increased greatly when civil war put the main Chinese center of porcelain production, in Jingdezhen, out of action for several decades. For the rest of the 17th century, most Japanese porcelain production was for export, mostly in Kyushu. The trade dwindled under renewed Chinese competition by the 1740s, before resuming after the opening of Japan in the mid-19th century.

Economic development during the Edo period included urbanization, increased shipping of commodities, a significant expansion of domestic and, initially, foreign commerce, and a diffusion of trade and handicraft industries. The construction trades flourished, along with banking facilities and merchant associations. Increasingly, han authorities oversaw the rising agricultural production and the spread of rural handicrafts.

By the mid-eighteenth century, Edo had a population of more than 1 million and Osaka and Kyoto each had more than 400,000 inhabitants. Many other castle towns grew as well. Osaka and Kyoto became busy trading and handicraft production centers, while Edo was the center for the supply of food and essential urban consumer goods.

Rice was the base of the economy, as the daimyō collected the taxes from the peasants in the form of rice. Taxes were high, about 40% of the harvest. The rice was sold at the fudasashi market in Edo. To raise money, the daimyō used forward contracts to sell rice that was not even harvested yet. These contracts were similar to modern futures trading.

Japan reopened its economy to the West after being pressured by the United States of America. During the period, Japan progressively studied Western sciences and techniques (called rangaku, literally "Dutch studies") through the information and books received through the Dutch traders in Dejima. The main areas that were studied included geography, medicine, natural sciences, astronomy, art, languages, physical sciences such as the study of electrical phenomena, and mechanical sciences as exemplified by the development of Japanese clockwatches, or wadokei, inspired from Western techniques.

Pre-war period (1868–1945)

Since the mid-19th century, after the Meiji Restoration, the country was opened up to Western commerce and influence and Japan has gone through two periods of economic development. The first began in earnest in 1868 and extended through to World War I; the second began in 1945 and a very rapid economic growth took place till 1973, slowed down a bit but continued till 1991.

Economic developments of the prewar period began with the "Rich State and Strong Army Policy" by the Meiji government. During the Meiji period (1868–1912), leaders inaugurated a new Western-based education system for all young people, sent thousands of students to the United States and Europe, and hired more than 3,000 Westerners to teach modern science, mathematics, technology, and foreign languages in Japan (Oyatoi gaikokujin). The government also built railroads, improved road, and inaugurated a land reform program to prepare the country for further development.

To promote industrialization, the government decided that, while it should help private business to allocate resources and to plan, the private sector was best equipped to stimulate economic growth. The greatest role of government was to help provide good economic conditions for business. In short, government was to be the guide and business the producer. In the early Meiji period, the government built factories and shipyards that were sold to entrepreneurs at a fraction of their value. Many of these businesses grew rapidly into the larger conglomerates. Government emerged as chief promoter of private enterprise, enacting a series of pro-business policies.

In the mid-1930s, the Japanese nominal wage rates were "10 times less" than the one of the U.S (based on mid-1930s exchange rates), while the price level is estimated to have been about 44% the one of the U.S.

The size and industrial structure of cities in Japan have maintained tight regularities despite substantial churning of population and industries across cities overtime.

Post-war period (1945–1989)

Government control and influence over businesses is widespread than most other countries. Instead of taking legislation action, their control is exercised through constant consultation with businesses and through the government's deep involvement in banking.

From the 1960s to the 1980s, overall real economic growth was extremely large: a 10% average in the 1960s, a 5% average in the 1970s and a 4% average in the 1980s. By the end of said period, Japan had moved into being a high-wage economy.

Heisei period (1989–2019)

Growth slowed markedly in the late 1990s also termed the Lost Decade after the collapse of Japanese asset price bubble. As a consequence Japan ran massive budget deficits (added trillions in Yen to Japanese financial system) to finance large public works programs.

By 1998, Japan's public works projects still could not stimulate demand enough to end the economy's stagnation. In desperation, the Japanese government undertook "structural reform" policies intended to wring speculative excesses from the stock and real estate markets. Unfortunately, these policies led Japan into deflation on numerous occasions between 1999 and 2004. The Bank of Japan used quantitative easing to expand the country's money supply in order to raise expectations of inflation and spur economic growth. Initially, the policy failed to induce any growth, but it eventually began to affect inflationary expectations. By late 2005, the economy finally began what seems to be a sustained recovery. GDP growth for that year was 2.8%, with an annualized fourth quarter expansion of 5.5%, surpassing the growth rates of the US and European Union during the same period. Unlike previous recovery trends, domestic consumption has been the dominant factor of growth.

Despite having interest rates down near zero for a long period of time, the quantitative easing strategy did not succeed in stopping price deflation. This led some economists, such as Paul Krugman, and some Japanese politicians, to advocate the generation of higher inflation expectations. In July 2006, the zero-rate policy was ended. In 2008, the Japanese Central Bank still had the lowest interest rates in the developed world, but deflation had still not been eliminated and the Nikkei 225 has fallen over approximately 50% (between June 2007 and December 2008). However, on 5 April 2013, the Bank of Japan announced that it would be purchasing 60–70 trillion yen in bonds and securities in an attempt to eliminate deflation by doubling the money supply in Japan over the course of two years. Markets around the world have responded positively to the government's current proactive policies, with the Nikkei 225 adding more than 42% since November 2012. The Economist has suggested that improvements to bankruptcy law, land transfer law, and tax laws will aid Japan's economy. In recent years, Japan has been the top export market for almost 15 trading nations worldwide.

In December 2018, a free trade agreement between Japan and the European Union was cleared to commence in February 2019. It creates the world's largest free trade zone valued at 1/3rd of global gross domestic product. This reduces tariffs on Japanese cars by 10%, duties by 30% on cheese and 10% on wines and opens service markets.

Reiwa period (2019–present)

2020–21 recession
Since early January 2020, Japanese economy began to suffer from the COVID-19 pandemic as several countries reported a significant increase in cases by March 2020. However, in early April, Japanese Prime Minister Shinzo Abe announced that he declared state of emergency, citing gave the nation its worst economic crisis since the end of World War II. Jun Saito of the Japan Center for Economic Research stated that the pandemic delivered the "final blow" to Japan's long fledging economy, which also resumed slow growth in 2018.
Less than a quarter of Japanese people expect living conditions to improve in the coming decades.

In October 2020 during the pandemic, Japan and the United Kingdom formally signed the first free-trade agreement post-Brexit, which will boost trade by approximately £15.2 billion. It enables tariff-free trade on 99% of exports to Japan.

On 15 February 2021, the Nikkei average breached the 30k benchmark, the highest since November 1991. It is due to strong corporate earnings, GDP data and optimism over COVID-19 vaccination program in the country.

In the year ending of March 2021 despite COVID-19 spreading, SoftBank Group made a record net profit of  45.88 billion, which is largely due to the debut of e-commerce company Coupang. However, this is the largest annual profit by a Japanese company in the nation's history.

As of result, Japanese economic impact of COVID-19 was officially ended by early October 2021 as the country ahead of the endemic phase.

Post-recession (2021–present)
At the end of March 2022, the Ministry of Finance announced that the national debt reached precisely 1.017 million billion yen. The total public debt of the country, which includes debts contracted by local governments, represents 1.210 million billion yen (9,200 billion dollars) which is nearly 250% of Japan’s GDP. Economist Kohei Iwahara said such an exceptional debt to GDP level is only possible because Japanese hold most of the debt: "“Japanese households hold most of their savings in bank accounts (48%) and these sums are used by commercial banks to buy Japanese government bonds. Thus, 85.7% of these bonds are held by Japanese investors.” However, an aging population could decrease savings.

Infrastructure

In 2018, Japan ranked 5th overall in the World Bank's Logistics Performance Index, and 2nd in the infrastructure category.

In 2005, one half of Japan's energy was produced from petroleum, a fifth from coal, and 14% from natural gas. Nuclear power in Japan made a quarter of electricity production but due to the Fukushima Daiichi nuclear disaster there has been a large desire to end Japan's nuclear power program. In September 2013, Japan closed its last 50 nuclear power plants nationwide, causing the nation to be nuclear free. The country has since then opted to restart a few of its nuclear reactors.

Japan's spendings on roads has been considered large. The 1.2 million kilometers of paved road are one of the major means of transportation. Japan has left-hand traffic. A single network of speed, divided, limited-access toll roads connects major cities and are operated by toll-collecting enterprises. New and used cars are inexpensive, and the Japanese government has encouraged people to buy hybrid vehicles. Car ownership fees and fuel levies are used to promote energy-efficiency.

Rail transport is a major means of transport in Japan. Dozens of Japanese railway companies compete in regional and local passenger transportation markets; for instance, 6 passenger JR enterprises, Kintetsu Railway, Seibu Railway, and Keio Corporation. Often, strategies of these enterprises contain real estate or department stores next to stations, and many major stations have major department stores near them. The Japanese cities of Fukuoka, Kobe, Kyoto, Nagoya, Osaka, Sapporo, Sendai, Tokyo and Yokohama all have subway systems. Some 250 high-speed Shinkansen trains connect major cities. All trains are known for punctuality, and a delay of 90 seconds can be considered late for some train services.

There are 98 passenger and 175 total airports in Japan, and flying is a popular way to travel. The largest domestic airport, Tokyo International Airport, is Asia's second busiest airport. The largest international gateways are Narita International Airport (Tokyo area), Kansai International Airport (Osaka/Kobe/Kyoto area), and Chūbu Centrair International Airport (Nagoya area). The largest ports in Japan include Nagoya Port, the Port of Yokohama, the Port of Tokyo and the Port of Kobe.

About 84% of Japan's energy is imported from other countries. Japan is the world's largest liquefied natural gas importer, second largest coal importer, and third largest net oil importer. Given its heavy dependence on imported energy, Japan has aimed to diversify its sources. Since the oil shocks of the 1970s, Japan has reduced dependence on petroleum as a source of energy from 77.4% in 1973 to about 43.7% in 2010 and increased dependence on natural gas and nuclear power. In September 2019, Japan will invest  10 billion on liquefied natural gas projects worldwide, in a strategy to boost the global LNG market and reinforce the security of energy supply. Other important energy source includes coal, and hydroelectricity is Japan's biggest renewable energy source. Japan's solar market is also currently booming. Kerosene is also used extensively for home heating in portable heaters, especially farther north. Many taxi companies run their fleets on liquefied natural gas. A recent success towards greater fuel economy was the introduction of mass-produced Hybrid vehicles. Prime Minister Shinzō Abe, who was working on Japan's economic revival, signed a treaty with Saudi Arabia and UAE about the rising prices of oil, ensuring Japan's stable deliveries from that region.

Macro-economic trend 

This is a chart of trend of gross domestic product of Japan at market prices estimated by the International Monetary Fund with figures in millions of Japanese Yen. See also

For purchasing power parity comparisons, the US dollar was exchanged at ￥109 in 2010.

GDP composition
Industries by GDP value-added 2012. Values are converted using the exchange rate on 13 April 2013.

Development of main indicators 
The following table shows the main economic indicators in 1980–2021 (with IMF staff stimtates in 2022–2027). Inflation under 5% is in green.

Sectors of the economy

Agriculture

The Japanese agricultural sector accounts for about 1.1% (2017) of the total country's GDP. Only 12% of Japan's land is suitable for cultivation. Due to this lack of arable land, a system of terraces is used to farm in small areas. This results in one of the world's highest levels of crop yields per unit area, with an overall agricultural self-sufficiency rate of about 50% on fewer than 56,000 km2 (14 million acres) cultivated.

Japan's small agricultural sector, however, is also highly subsidized and protected, with government regulations that favor small-scale cultivation instead of large-scale agriculture as practiced in North America. There has been a growing concern about farming as the current farmers are aging with a difficult time finding successors.

Rice accounts for almost all of Japan's cereal production. Japan is the second-largest agricultural product importer in the world. Rice, the most protected crop, is subject to tariffs of 777.7%.

Although Japan is usually self-sufficient in rice (except for its use in making rice crackers and processed foods) and wheat, the country must import about 50% of its requirements of other grain and fodder crops and relies on imports for half of its supply of meat. Japan imports large quantities of wheat and soybeans. Japan is the 5th largest market for the European Union's agricultural exports. Over 90% of mandarin oranges in Japan are grown in Japan. Apples are also grown due to restrictions on apple imports.

Fishery 

Japan ranked fourth in the world in 1996 in tonnage of fish caught. Japan captured 4,074,580 metric tons of fish in 2005, down from 4,987,703 tons in 2000, 9,558,615 tons in 1990, 9,864,422 tons in 1980, 8,520,397 tons in 1970, 5,583,796 tons in 1960 and 2,881,855 tons in 1950. In 2003, the total aquaculture production was predicted at 1,301,437 tonnes. In 2010, Japan's total fisheries production was 4,762,469 fish. Offshore fisheries accounted for an average of 50% of the nation's total fish catches in the late 1980s although they experienced repeated ups and downs during that period.

Coastal fishing by small boats, set nets, or breeding techniques accounts for about one third of the industry's total production, while offshore fishing by medium-sized boats makes up for more than half the total production. Deep-sea fishing from larger vessels makes up the rest. Among the many species of seafood caught are sardines, skipjack tuna, crab, shrimp, salmon, pollock, squid, clams, mackerel, sea bream, sauries, tuna and Japanese amberjack. Freshwater fishing, including salmon, trout and eel hatcheries and fish farms, takes up about 30% of Japan's fishing industry. Among the nearly 300 fish species in the rivers of Japan are native varieties of catfish, chub, herring and goby, as well as such freshwater crustaceans as crabs and crayfish. Marine and freshwater aquaculture is conducted in all 47 prefectures in Japan.

Japan maintains one of the world's largest fishing fleets and accounts for nearly 15% of the global catch, prompting some claims that Japan's fishing is leading to depletion in fish stocks such as tuna. Japan has also sparked controversy by supporting quasi-commercial whaling.

Industry 

Japanese manufacturing and industry is very diversified, with a variety of advanced industries that are highly successful. Industry accounts for 30.1% (2017) of the nation's GDP. The country's manufacturing output is the third highest in the world.

Industry is concentrated in several regions, with the Kantō region surrounding Tokyo, (the Keihin industrial region) as well as the Kansai region surrounding Osaka (the Hanshin industrial region) and the Tōkai region surrounding Nagoya (the Chūkyō–Tōkai industrial region) the main industrial centers. Other industrial centers include the southwestern part of Honshū and northern Shikoku around the Seto Inland Sea (the Setouchi industrial region); and the northern part of Kyūshū (Kitakyūshū). In addition, a long narrow belt of industrial centers called the Taiheiyō Belt is found between Tokyo and Fukuoka, established by particular industries, that have developed as mill towns.

Japan enjoys high technological development in many fields, including consumer electronics, automobile manufacturing, semiconductor manufacturing, optical fibers, optoelectronics, optical media, facsimile and copy machines, and fermentation processes in food and biochemistry. However, many Japanese companies are facing emerging rivals from the United States, South Korea, and China.

Automobile manufacturing 

Japan is the third biggest producer of automobiles in the world. Toyota is currently the world's largest car maker, and the Japanese car makers Nissan, Honda, Suzuki, and Mazda also count for some of the largest car makers in the world.

Mining and petroleum exploration

Japan's mining production has been minimal, and Japan has very little mining deposits. However, massive deposits of rare earths have been found off the coast of Japan. In the 2011 fiscal year, the domestic yield of crude oil was 820 thousand kiloliters, which was 0.4% of Japan's total crude processing volume.

In 2019, Japan was the 2nd largest world producer of iodine, 4th largest worldwide producer of bismuth, the world's 9th largest producer of sulfur and the 10th largest producer of gypsum.

Services 

Japan's service sector accounts for 68.7% (2017) of its total economic output. Banking, insurance, real estate, retailing, transportation, and telecommunications are all major industries such as Mitsubishi UFJ, Mizuho, NTT, TEPCO, Nomura, Mitsubishi Estate, ÆON, Mitsui Sumitomo, Softbank, JR East, Seven & I, KDDI and Japan Airlines counting as one of the largest companies in the world. Four of the five most circulated newspapers in the world are Japanese newspapers. The Koizumi government set Japan Post, one of the country's largest providers of savings and insurance services for privatization by 2015. The six major keiretsus are the Mitsubishi, Sumitomo, Fuyo, Mitsui, Dai-Ichi Kangyo and Sanwa Groups. Japan is home to 251 companies from the Forbes Global 2000 or 12.55% (as of 2013).

Tourism 

In 2012, Japan was the fifth most visited country in Asia and the Pacific, with over 8.3 million tourists. In 2013, due to the weaker yen and easier visa requirements for southwest Asian countries, Japan received a record 11.25 million visitors, which was higher than the government's projected goal of 10 million visitors. The government hopes to attract 40 million visitors a year by the 2020 Summer Olympics in Tokyo. Some of the most popular visited places include the Shinjuku, Ginza, Shibuya and Asakusa areas in Tokyo, and the cities of Osaka, Kobe and Kyoto, as well as Himeji Castle. Hokkaido is also a popular winter destination for visitors with several ski resorts and luxury hotels being built there.

Japan's economy is less dependent on international tourism than those of other G7 countries and OECD countries in general; from 1995 to 2014, it was by far the least visited country in the G7 despite being the second largest country in the group, and as of 2013 was one of the least visited countries in the OECD on a per capita basis. In 2013, international tourist receipts was 0.3% of Japan's GDP, while the corresponding figure was 1.3% for the United States and 2.3% for France.

Finance

The Tokyo Stock Exchange is the third largest stock exchange in the world by market capitalization, as well as the 2nd largest stock market in Asia, with 2,292 listed companies. The Nikkei 225 and the TOPIX are the two important stock market indexes of the Tokyo Stock Exchange. The Tokyo Stock Exchange and the Osaka Stock Exchange, another major stock exchange in Japan, merged on 1 January 2013, creating one of the world's largest stock exchanges. Other stock exchanges in Japan include the Nagoya Stock Exchange, Fukuoka Stock Exchange and Sapporo Securities Exchange.

Labor force

The unemployment rate in December 2013 was 3.7%, down 1.5 percentage points from the claimed unemployment rate of 5.2% in June 2009 due to the strong economic recovery.

In 2008 Japan's labor force consisted of some 66 million workers—40% of whom were women—and was rapidly shrinking.
One major long-term concern for the Japanese labor force is its low birthrate. In 2005, the number of deaths in Japan exceeded the number of births, indicating that the decline in population had already started. While one countermeasure for a declining birthrate would be to increase immigration, Japan has struggled to attract potential migrants despite immigration laws being relatively lenient (especially for high-skilled workers) compared to other developed countries. This is also apparent when looking at Japan's work visa programme for "specified skilled worker", which had less than 3,000 applicants, despite an annual goal of attracting 40,000 overseas workers, suggesting Japan faces major challenges in attracting migrants compared to other developed countries regardless of its immigration policies. A Gallup poll found that few potential migrants wished to migrate to Japan compared to other G7 countries, consistent with the country's low migrant inflow.

In 1989, the predominantly public sector union confederation, SOHYO (General Council of Trade Unions of Japan), merged with RENGO (Japanese Private Sector Trade Union Confederation) to form the Japanese Trade Union Confederation. Labor union membership is about 12 million.

As of 2019 Japan's unemployment rate was the lowest in the G7. Its employment rate for the working-age population (15-64) was the highest in the G7.

Law and government 
Japan ranks 27th of 185 countries in the ease of doing business index 2013.

Japan has one of the smallest tax rates in the developed world. After deductions, the majority of workers are free from personal income taxes. Consumption tax rate is 10%, while corporate tax rates are high, second highest corporate tax rate in the world, at 36.8%. However, the House of Representatives has passed a bill which increased the consumption tax to 10% in October 2015. The government has also decided to reduce corporate tax and to phase out automobile tax.

In 2016, the IMF encouraged Japan to adopt an income policy that pushes firms to raise employee wages in combination with reforms to tackle the labor market dual tiered employment system to drive higher wages, on top of monetary and fiscal stimulus. Shinzo Abe has encouraged firms to raise wages by at least three percent annually (the inflation target plus average productivity growth).

Shareholder activism is rare despite the fact that the corporate law gives shareholders strong powers over managers. Under Prime Minister Shinzō Abe, corporate governance reform has been a key initiative to encourage economic growth. In 2012 around 40% of leading Japanese companies had any independent directors while in 2016 most all have begun to appoint independent directors.

The government's liabilities include the second largest public debt of any nation with debt of over one quadrillion yen, or  8,535,340,000,000 in USD. Former Prime Minister Naoto Kan has called the situation 'urgent'.

Japan's central bank has the second largest foreign-exchange reserves after the People's Republic of China, with over one trillion US Dollars in foreign reserves.

Culture

Overview

Nemawashi (根回し), or "consensus building", in Japanese culture is an informal process of quietly laying the foundation for some proposed change or project, by talking to the people concerned, gathering support and feedback, and so forth. It is considered an important element in any major change, before any formal steps are taken, and successful nemawashi enables changes to be carried out with the consent of all sides.

Japanese companies are known for management methods such as "The Toyota Way". Kaizen (改善, Japanese for "improvement") is a Japanese philosophy that focuses on continuous improvement throughout all aspects of life. When applied to the workplace, Kaizen activities continually improve all functions of a business, from manufacturing to management and from the CEO to the assembly line workers. By improving standardized activities and processes, Kaizen aims to eliminate waste (see Lean manufacturing). Kaizen was first implemented in several Japanese businesses during the country's recovery after World War II, including Toyota, and has since spread to businesses throughout the world. Within certain value systems, it is ironic that Japanese workers labor amongst the most hours per day, even though kaizen is supposed to improve all aspects of life. According to the OECD, annual hours worked per employee is below the OECD average and in the middle among G7 countries.

Some companies have powerful enterprise unions and shuntō. The Nenko System or Nenko Joretsu, as it is called in Japan, is the Japanese system of promoting an employee based on his or her proximity to retirement. The advantage of the system is that it allows older employees to achieve a higher salary level before retirement and it usually brings more experience to the executive ranks. The disadvantage of the system is that it does not allow new talent to be combined with experience and those with specialized skills cannot be promoted to the already crowded executive ranks. It also does not guarantee or even attempt to bring the "right person for the right job".

Relationships between government bureaucrats and companies are often close.  is the institutionalised practice where Japanese senior bureaucrats retire to high-profile positions in the private and public sectors. The practice is increasingly viewed as corrupt and a limitation on efforts to reduce ties between the private sector and the state that prevent economic and political reforms. Lifetime employment (shūshin koyō) and seniority-based career advancement have been common in the Japanese work environment. Japan has begun to gradually move away from some of these norms.

 refers to someone whose income is salary based; particularly those working for corporations. Its frequent use by Japanese corporations, and its prevalence in Japanese manga and anime has gradually led to its acceptance in English-speaking countries as a noun for a Japanese white-collar businessman. The word can be found in many books and articles pertaining to Japanese culture. Immediately following World War II, becoming a salaryman was viewed as a gateway to a stable, middle-class lifestyle. In modern use, the term carries associations of long working hours, low prestige in the corporate hierarchy, absence of significant sources of income other than salary, wage slavery, and karōshi. The term salaryman refers almost exclusively to males.

An office lady, often abbreviated OL (Japanese: オーエル Ōeru), is a female office worker in Japan who performs generally pink collar tasks such as serving tea and secretarial or clerical work. Like many unmarried Japanese, OLs often live with their parents well into early adulthood. Office ladies are usually full-time permanent staff, although the jobs they do usually have little opportunity for promotion, and there is usually the tacit expectation that they leave their jobs once they get married.

 is a Japanese expression for people between the age of 15 and 34 who lack full-time employment or are unemployed, excluding homemakers and students. They may also be described as underemployed or freelance workers. These people do not start a career after high school or university but instead usually live as parasite singles with their parents and earn some money with low skilled and low paid jobs. The low income makes it difficult for freeters to start a family, and the lack of qualifications makes it difficult to start a career at a later point in life.

, which can be translated quite literally from Japanese as "death from overwork", is occupational sudden death. The major medical causes of karōshi deaths are heart attack and stroke due to stress.

, (sometimes also translated as corporate bouncers, meeting-men, or corporate blackmailers) are a form of specialized racketeer unique to Japan, and often associated with the yakuza that extort money from or blackmail companies by threatening to publicly humiliate companies and their management, usually in their .  is a Japanese term for moneylender, or loan shark. It is a contraction of the Japanese words for salaryman and cash. Around 14 million people, or 10% of the Japanese population, have borrowed from a sarakin. In total, there are about 10,000 firms (down from 30,000 a decade ago); however, the top seven firms make up 70% of the market. The value of outstanding loans totals  100 billion. The biggest sarakin are publicly traded and often allied with big banks.

The first "Western-style" department store in Japan was Mitsukoshi, founded in 1904, which has its root as a kimono store called Echigoya from 1673. When the roots are considered, however, Matsuzakaya has an even longer history, dated from 1611. The kimono store changed to a department store in 1910. In 1924, Matsuzakaya store in Ginza allowed street shoes to be worn indoors, something innovative at the time. These former kimono shop department stores dominated the market in its earlier history. They sold, or rather displayed, luxurious products, which contributed for their sophisticated atmospheres. Another origin of Japanese department store is that from railway company. There have been many private railway operators in the nation, and from the 1920s, they started to build department stores directly linked to their lines' termini. Seibu and Hankyu are the typical examples of this type. From the 1980s onwards, Japanese department stores face fierce competition from supermarkets and convenience stores, gradually losing their presences. Still, depāto are bastions of several aspects of cultural conservatism in the country. Gift certificates for prestigious department stores are frequently given as formal presents in Japan. Department stores in Japan generally offer a wide range of services and can include foreign exchange, travel reservations, ticket sales for local concerts and other events.

Keiretsu

A  is a set of companies with interlocking business relationships and shareholdings. A keiretsu unequivocally exists as an identical form of business structure to the affiliate, or an associate. It is a type of business group. The prototypical keiretsu appeared in Japan during the "economic miracle" following World War II. Before Japan's surrender, Japanese industry was controlled by large family-controlled vertical monopolies called zaibatsu. The Allies dismantled the zaibatsu in the late 1940s, but the companies formed from the dismantling of the zaibatsu were reintegrated. The dispersed corporations were re-interlinked through share purchases to form horizontally integrated alliances across many industries. Where possible, keiretsu companies would also supply one another, making the alliances vertically integrated as well. In this period, official government policy promoted the creation of robust trade corporations that could withstand pressures from intensified world trade competition.

The major keiretsu were each centered on one bank, which lent money to the keiretsu's member companies and held equity positions in the companies. Each central bank had great control over the companies in the keiretsu and acted as a monitoring entity and as an emergency bail-out entity. One effect of this structure was to minimize the presence of hostile takeovers in Japan, because no entities could challenge the power of the banks.

There are two types of keiretsu: vertical and horizontal. Vertical keiretsu illustrates the organization and relationships within a company (for example all factors of production of a certain product are connected), while a horizontal keiretsu shows relationships between entities and industries, normally centered on a bank and trading company. Both are complexly woven together and sustain each other.

The Japanese recession in the 1990s had profound effects on the keiretsu. Many of the largest banks were hit hard by bad loan portfolios and forced to merge or go out of business. This had the effect of blurring the lines between the keiretsu: Sumitomo Bank and Mitsui Bank, for instance, became Sumitomo Mitsui Banking Corporation in 2001, while Sanwa Bank (the banker for the Hankyu-Toho Group) became part of Bank of Tokyo-Mitsubishi UFJ, now known as MUFG Bank. Additionally, many companies from outside the keiretsu system, such as Sony, began outperforming their counterparts within the system.

Generally, these causes gave rise to a strong notion in the business community that the old keiretsu system was not an effective business model, and led to an overall loosening of keiretsu alliances. While the keiretsu still exist, they are not as centralized or integrated as they were before the 1990s. This, in turn, has led to a growing corporate acquisition industry in Japan, as companies are no longer able to be easily "bailed out" by their banks, as well as rising derivative litigation by more independent shareholders.

Mergers and acquisitions 
Japanese companies have been involved in 50,759 deals between 1985 and 2018. This cumulates to a total value of 2,636 bil. USD which translates to 281,469.9 bil. YEN. In the year 1999 there was an all-time high in terms of value of deals with almost 220 bil. USD. The most active year so far was 2017 with over 3,150 deals, but only a total value of 114 bil. USD (see graph "M&A in Japan by number and value").

Here is a list of the most important deals (ranked by value in bil. USD) in Japanese history:

Among the top 50 deals by value, 92% of the time the acquiring nation is Japan. Foreign direct investment is playing a much smaller role than national M&A in Japan.

Other economic indicators 

Net international investment position: 266,223 \ billion (1st)

Industrial Production Growth Rate: 7.5% (2010 est.)

Investment (gross fixed): 20.3% of GDP (2010 est.)

Household income or consumption by percentage share:
 Lowest 10%: 4.8%
 Highest 10%: 21.7% (1993)
Agriculture – Products: rice, sugar beets, vegetables, fruit, pork, poultry, dairy products, eggs, fish

Exports – Commodities: machinery and equipment, motor vehicles, semiconductors, chemicals

Imports – Commodities: machinery and equipment, fuels, foodstuffs, chemicals, textiles, raw materials (2001)

Exchange rates:
Japanese Yen per US$1 – 88.67 (2010), 93.57 (2009), 103.58 (2008), 117.99 (2007), 116.18 (2006), 109.69 (2005), 115.93 (2003), 125.39 (2002), 121.53 (2001), 105.16 (January 2000), 113.91 (1999), 130.91 (1998), 120.99 (1997), 108.78 (1996), 94.06 (1995)

Electricity:
 Electricity – consumption: 925.5 billion kWh (2008)
 Electricity – production: 957.9 billion kWh (2008 est.)
 Electricity – exports: 0 kWh (2008)
 Electricity – imports: 0 kWh (2008)

Electricity – Production by source:
 Fossil Fuel: 69.7%
 Hydro: 7.3%
 Nuclear: 22.5%
 Other: 0.5% (2008)

Electricity – Standards:
 100 volts at 50 Hz from the Ōi River (in Shizuoka) Northward;
 100 volts at 60 Hz Southward

Oil:
 production:  (2009) (46th)
 consumption:  (2009) (3rd)
 exports:  (2008) (64th)
 imports:  (2008) (2nd)
 net imports:  (2008 est.)
 proved reserves:  (1 January 2010 est.)

See also 

 Economic history of Japan
 Economic relations of Japan
 List of exports of Japan
 List of countries by leading trade partners
 List of the largest trading partners of Japan
List of largest Japanese companies
 Japan External Trade Organization
 Tokugawa coinage
 Tourism in Japan
 Japanese post-war economic miracle
 Japanese asset price bubble
 Machine orders, an economic indicator specific to the Japanese economy
 Quantitative easing
 Loans in Japan

Notes

External links

 
 Bank of Japan
 Minister of Finance (Japan)
 Cabinet Office Monthly Economic Report and Main Economic Indicators
 Japan economy at a glance at the Financial Times 
 Japan profile at The World Bank 
 Japan - OECD
 Japan Trade Organization

 
Japan
Japan